Morlaye Cissé (born 19 December 1983 in Conakry) is a retired Guinean football defender.

He was a member of the Guinea squad for the 2006 African Nations Cup where the team were eliminated in the quarter-finals.

External links

Profile at RFI
Morlaye Cissé at Footballdatabase

1983 births
Living people
Guinean footballers
Guinea international footballers
LB Châteauroux players
GSI Pontivy players
CS Sedan Ardennes players
ES Viry-Châtillon players
FC Mulhouse players
EGS Gafsa players
Expatriate footballers in France
Expatriate footballers in Tunisia
2006 Africa Cup of Nations players
2012 Africa Cup of Nations players
Horoya AC players
Association football defenders